W Canis Majoris (W CMa) is a carbon star in the constellation Canis Major. A cool star, it has a surface temperature of around 2,900 K and a radius 234 times that of the Sun, with a bolometric absolute magnitude of −4.13 and distance estimated at 443 or 445 parsecs (1,444–1,450 light-years) based on bolometric magnitude or radius. The Gaia Data Release 2 parallax of  implies a distance of about 555 parsecs.

W CMa is classified as a slow irregular variable star. Detailed analyses have found only very weak and probably spurious periods of approximately a month. It is a carbon star, an asymptotic giant branch star where carbon and s-process elements have been dredged up to the surface during thermal pulses of the helium-burning shell.

References 

Canis Major
Carbon stars
Canis Majoris, W
Durchmusterung objects
054361
034413
Asymptotic-giant-branch stars
Slow irregular variables